Poteat is a surname. Notable people with the surname include:

Hank Poteat (born 1977), American football player
Harrison Poteat, American clergyman
Joshua Poteat, American poet
S. Eugene Poteat (born c. 1935), Central Intelligence Agency executive
William H. Poteat (1919–2000), American academic and philosopher
William Louis Poteat (1856–1938), American academic and college president